Baljit Singh Deo is an Indian music and movie director of Punjabi language.

Early life
Baljit Singh Deo was born in Jalandhar, 1900–1950 Punjab, India. At an early age, he moved to England with his family where he did his studies in engineering (Microelectronics).

Career
After completing his studies in Microelectronics, Baljit Singh Deo worked as an engineer for a few years for companies like Motorola and Development Director at  EA Sports. However, his passion was somewhere else.  He left his career as an engineer and pursued photography and video direction. He set up his creative design firm Deo Studios.

After some time into photography, Baljit Singh Deo stepped into Punjabi music video direction as he  directed his first Punjabi music video Punjabi singer Sukhdev Sukha.

Now he is working in Punjabi movies as he Directed Jag Jeondeyan De Mele starring Harbhajan Maan and Tulip Joshi & Mirza The Untold Story starring Gippy Grewal, Mandy Takhar and Rahul Dev. His upcoming movie is Himmat Singh starring Arjan Bajwa, Kajal Jain, Yaad Grewal and Hemant Aangrish scheduled to release in 2014.

Director (music videos)
 Tu Judaa - Amrinder Gill -(Director / Editor / DOP)
 Tere Bina - Amrinder Gill -(Director / Editor / DOP)
 Dildarian - Amrinder Gill - (Director / Editor / DOP)
 Jogi - Mukhtar Sahota -(Director / Editor / DOP)
 Surma - Jazzy B -(Director / Editor / DOP)
 Nakhro - Jazzy B
 Oh Na Kuri Labde - Jazzy B and Sukshinder Shinda
 Bhuli Visri Kahani - Harbhajan Mann
 Tim Timaunde Tareya - Gurdas Mann
 Punjabi Clap - Sukshinder Shinda -(Director / Editor / DOP)
 Dil Nahi Lagda - Aman Hayer -(Director / Editor / DOP)
 Jugni - Arif Lohar -(Director / Editor / DOP)
 Flower - Gippy Grewal -(Director / Editor / DOP)
 Huthiyar - Gippy Grewal -(Director / Editor / DOP)
 String Is Kinng - BattleKatt 
 Hello Hello - Gippy Grewal -(Director / Editor / DOP)
 Patt Lainge - Gippy Grewal
Hikk Vich Jann - Gippy Grewal -(Director / Editor / DOP)
Jaan - Gippy Grewal -(Director / Editor / DOP)
Ghat Boldi - Gippy Grewal -(Director / Editor / DOP)
Car Nach Di - Gippy Grewal Ft Bohemia (rapper) (Director / Editor / DOP)
 Dark Love - Sidhu Moose Wala -(Director / Editor / DOP)
 Issa Jatt - Sidhu Moose Wala -(Director / Editor / DOP)
 It's All About You - Sidhu Moose Wala -(Director / Editor / DOP)
 Sooraj - Gippy Grewal -(Director / Editor / DOP)
 Hukam - Gippy Grewal -(Director / Editor / DOP)
Weekend- Gippy Grewal-(Director / Editor / DOP)
 Aar Nanak Par Nanak -Diljit Dosanjh -(Director / Editor / DOP)
 pagal -Happy Raikoti-(Director / Editor / DOP)
 Shama Payia -Arjan Dhillion and Nimrat Khaira-(Director / Editor / DOP)
 Jaan -Nimrat Khaira-(Director / Editor / DOP)
 Frozi -Nimrat Khaira-(Director / Editor / DOP)
 score -Arjan Dhillon -(Director / DOP)
 what ave  -Diljit Dosanjh and Nimrat Khaira-(Director / DOP)

Director (Films)

References

External links
 - Baljit Singh Deo - Deo Studios
 

Year of birth missing (living people)
Living people
People from Jalandhar
Film directors from Punjab, India
Indian music video directors
Punjabi-language film directors
21st-century Indian film directors